Biyun Temple may refer to:

Temple of Azure Clouds, or Biyun Temple, Buddhist temple in Beijing, China
Biyun Chan Temple, temple in Changhua County, Taiwan

See also
Baiyun Temple (disambiguation)